Sitobion indicum is a species of aphid. It is a pest of millets.

References

Macrosiphini
Insect pests of millets
Insects described in 1964